Megan Gunning (born July 13, 1992) is a Canadian freestyle skier. She won the silver medal in the halfpipe at the 2009 FIS Freestyle World Ski Championships as well as two medals in Winter X Games competition. Gunning was named to the 2014 Winter Olympics team in ski halfpipe but she injured her knee on while preparing for the X-games and was unable to compete at the Olympics.

References

External links
 https://www.facebook.com/MeganGunningski
 https://twitter.com/MeganGunning13

1992 births
Living people
Canadian female freestyle skiers
Superpipe skiers
X Games athletes